Prospect Mountain High School is a public high school located in Alton, New Hampshire, United States, and is attended by students from Alton and Barnstead. It has been in operation since 2004. Prospect Mountain's athletic teams are known as the Timberwolves.

References

External links
Official website

Schools in Belknap County, New Hampshire
Public high schools in New Hampshire
Alton, New Hampshire
2004 establishments in New Hampshire